This is a list of Benedictine theologians, in other words Roman Catholic theological writers who were Benedictine monks.

Source: Catholic Encyclopedia of 1913.

 Uhtred
 Anselm of Canterbury (1033–1109)
 Guitmund
 Rabanus Maurus
 Pietro Delfino (1444–1525), Camaldolese
 Jacques Le Bossu (1546–1626)
 François Delfau (1637–1676)
 Antoine-Joseph Mège (1625–1691)
 Paul Mezger (1637–1702)
 Matthieu Petit-Didier (1659–1728)
 Johann Franz Bessel (1672–1749)
 Mattheus Pinna da Encarnaçao (1687–1764)
 Dominic Schram (1722–1797)
 Marian Dobmayer (1753–1805)
 Maurus von Schenkl (1749–1816)
 Donatien de Bruyne (1871–1935)
 Bonifatius Fischer (1915–1997)

 
Lists of theologians and religious studies scholars
Lists of Roman Catholics